Jiří Fejtek (born 22 September 1946) is a Czech gymnast. He competed at the 1968 Summer Olympics and the 1972 Summer Olympics.

References

1946 births
Living people
Czech male artistic gymnasts
Olympic gymnasts of Czechoslovakia
Gymnasts at the 1968 Summer Olympics
Gymnasts at the 1972 Summer Olympics
Gymnasts from Prague